WISEPC J150649.97+702736.0 (designation abbreviated to WISE 1506+7027, or WISE J1506+7027) is a brown dwarf star of spectral class T6, located in constellation Ursa Minor. It is one of the Sun's nearest neighbors, at a distance of 16.85 light-years. Brown dwarfs closer to the Sun include Luhman 16 and WISE 0855−0714. Other brown dwarfs that may be closer to the Sun include ε Indi Ba and ε Indi Bb at 11.8 light-years and WISE 0350-5658 at  light-years.

Discovery
WISE 1506+7027 was discovered in 2011 from data collected by the Wide-field Infrared Survey Explorer (WISE) in the infrared at a wavelength of 40 cm (16 in), whose mission lasted from December 2009 to February 2011. In 2011, Kirkpatrick and colleagues published a paper in The Astrophysical Journal Supplement, where they presented discovery of 98 new found by WISE brown dwarf systems with components of spectral types M, L, T and Y, among which also was WISE 1506+7027.

Distance
The Gaia spacecraft determined an updated parallax of 193.5 milliarcseconds leading to a distance of 16.85 light years.

Space motion
WISE 1506+7027 has a large proper motion of about 1,623 milliarcseconds per year.

Notes

References

Brown dwarfs
Local Bubble
T-type stars
Ursa Minor (constellation)
20110901
WISE objects